Edgehill, Virginia may refer to:
Edgehill, Gloucester County, Virginia
Edgehill, King George County, Virginia

See also
 Edge Hill (Shadwell, Virginia)